Mokdad El-Yamine (born 13 July 1986 in Marseille) is an Algerian taekwondo practitioner. He competed in the 58 kg event at the 2012 Summer Olympics and was eliminated in the preliminary round by Óscar Muñoz.

References

1986 births
Living people
Algerian male taekwondo practitioners
Olympic taekwondo practitioners of Algeria
Taekwondo practitioners at the 2012 Summer Olympics
Sportspeople from Marseille
21st-century Algerian people